Alejandro Reyes may refer to:

 Alejandro Reyes (politician), Chilean lawyer and politician
 Alejandro Reyes (singer), Swiss-Chilean singer and songwriter
 Alejandro Reyes (squash player), Mexican squash player
 Alejandro Aguilar Reyes, Mexican sportswriter